Blečji Vrh (in older sources also Bleč Vrh) is a settlement in the Municipality of Grosuplje in central Slovenia. The area is part of the historical region of Lower Carniola. The municipality is now included in the Central Slovenia Statistical Region.

Name
Blečji Vrh was attested in written sources as Welze in 1145 and Weltsperg in 1505.

Church
The local church is dedicated to Saint Benedict and belongs to the Parish of Polica. It is a 13th-century Romanesque building that was expanded in the 18th and 19th centuries.

References

External links

Blečji Vrh on Geopedia

Populated places in the Municipality of Grosuplje